Everydaydream is the final studio album by the Australian rock band Died Pretty. The album, recorded with producer Wayne Connolly and released in October 2000, injected a strongly electronic feel into the band's sound with its extensive use of synthesizers and drum machines.

Track listing
(All songs by Brett Myers and Ron Peno)
 "Misunderstood" – 5:00
 "Brighter Ideas"  – 3:30
 "Special Way"   – 3:49
 "Burning Mad" – 5:53
 "That Look Before" – 3:59
 "Here Comes the Night" – 5:56
 "Call Me Sir" – 4:54
 "Dream Alone"  – 4:27
 "Watch Out Below" – 5:20
 "The Evening Shadows"– 4:50

Personnel
 Ron S. Peno — vocals
 Brett Myers — guitar
 John Hoey — keyboards
 Robert Warren — bass guitar
 Simon Cox — drums

References

2000 albums
Died Pretty albums